Johnson Wildlife Management Area is a Wildlife Management Area in Wicomico County, Maryland.

External links
 Johnson Wildlife Management Area

Wildlife management areas of Maryland
Protected areas of Wicomico County, Maryland